

Burrus
Burrus may refer to:

Places
Château Burrus is a château in the department of Haut-Rhin, Alsace, France
Hollywood, also known as The Burrus House, is a building near Benoit, Mississippi

People
Charles Sidney Burrus, is an American electrical engineer
Daniel Burrus, is an American futurist, business advisor, author, and frequent speaker about business strategy and innovation
Dick Burrus or Maurice Lennon "Dick" Burrus, was a professional baseball player
Dixie Burrus Browning, née Burrus, is an American artist and writer of over 100 romance novels
Ernest J. Burrus, was a Jesuit and a leading historian of northwestern New Spain, particularly the Baja California peninsula and Sonora
James Dallas Burrus, was an African-American educator, druggist and philanthropist
Kevin Omni Burrus, was the assistant director for the documentary "How Do I Look NYC," produced by Wolfgang Busch
Lucius Antistius Burrus Adventus (died 188) was a Roman Senator that lived in the 2nd century
Mary Burrus Williams, is the co-author with her sister, Dixie Burrus Browning, of historical novels under the pen name Bronwyn Williams
Maurice Jean Marie Burrus, was an Alsatian tobacco magnate, politician and philatelist
Sextus Afranius Burrus, was a prefect of the Praetorian Guard
Terrance Corley Burrus, is an American keyboardist, composer, record producer, conductor, business, realty and fashion designer executive

Other
Western trumpeter whiting, Sillago burrus, is a species of marine fish of the smelt whiting family Sillaginidae

See also